The Second Perso-Turkic War began in 606/607 with an invasion of the Sasanian Empire by the Göktürks and Hephthalites. The war ended in 608 with the defeat of the Turks and Hephthalites by the Sasanians under the Armenian general Smbat IV Bagratuni.

Context
In 606/607, the Turks invaded eastern Persia with a large number of men, but were defeated in the first battle near the fort of Tus in Khorasan. Having lost this battle, the Turks and Hephthalites requested reinforcements from the Khagan. According to Sebeos, 300,000 troops were sent to reinforce the invading army.

This force soon overran Khorasan as well as the fort of Tus with its 300 defenders under prince Datoyean. However, the Turks withdrew after their raids, which went as far as Isfahan. Smbat quickly reorganized the eastern Persian forces and finally crushed the Turks and Hephthalites, reportedly killing their leader in hand-to-hand combat (mard o mard).

After the death of their leader, which shattered troop morale, the Turks and Hephthalites retreated in a disorderly manner. The Aswaran pursued them, routed them and killed many.

Notes

References

Sources

See also 
First Perso-Turkic War
Third Perso-Turkic War

600s conflicts
Turkic War 2
Military history of the Göktürks
607
606
608